Paratrooper Sanjog Chhetri, AC (26 June 1982 – 22 April 2003) was an Indian paratrooper of the 9 Para (Special Forces) who was posthumously awarded India's peace time military decoration Ashoka Chakra. Aged 20, when he was posthumously awarded the decoration. He was the youngest recipient of the Ashoka Chakra.

Early life
Paratrooper Sanjog Chhetri was born on 26 June 1982 at Boomtar in Sikkim, to a Hindu Chhetri family. Chhetri lost his father at a very young age. He and his sister Sangeeta were brought up by his uncle.

Military career
Sanjog Chhetri opted for 9 Para (Special Forces) on 31 March 2001 at the age of 19 years.

On 22 April 2003, he led a team of 20 commandos in carrying out operations in the terrorist location at Hill Kaka in Jammu and Kashmir under Operation Sarp Vinash. The commandos approached the terrorist hideout and drew heavy automatic fire. Sensing danger for his fellow soldiers, Sanjog assaulted the mountain hideout after crawling 100 yards and killed one terrorist. Despite the gunshot wounds he sustained and the profuse bleeding, Chhetri killed one more terrorist and offered an opportunity for his team to engage the remaining terrorists effectively. The commando team killed all the remaining terrorists. Chhetri later succumbed to his injuries.

Ashoka Chakra awardee
For his raw courage, bravery and *SUPREME SACRIFICE* for his nation, he was posthumously awarded the Ashoka Chakra, the highest peace time military decoration in India.

See also 
 Para (Special Forces)
 Mohit Sharma (soldier)

References

2003 deaths
Recipients of the Ashoka Chakra (military decoration)
1982 births
Indian Army officers
Paratroopers
Para Commandos
Ashoka Chakra